Singaporean Hokkien is the largest non-Mandarin Chinese dialect spoken in Singapore. As such, it exerts the greatest influence on Colloquial Singaporean Mandarin, resulting in a Hokkien-style Singaporean Mandarin widely spoken in the country.

Influences on phonology

Some Hokkien Singaporeans are unable to accurately pronounce the sounds of Standard Mandarin due to influences from their Hokkien mother tongue. These include consonants such as f, z, zh, s, r. They also pronounce some vowels and rhymes such as i, e, en, eng differently. In terms of tone, they often bring the checked tone of Hokkien into Mandarin.

Hokkien-derived vocabulary

The use of Hokkien vocabulary in Singaporean Mandarin can be categorized as such:
Use of Hokkien words in lieu of standard Mandarin words (loanwords)
Use of Hokkien monosyllabic words in lieu of standard disyllabic Mandarin words (calques)
Replacing of Mandarin morphemes with Hokkien morphemes
Use of Hokkien word order (in vocabulary) in lieu of standard Mandarin word order
Modifying the meaning of Mandarin word using Hokkien words (loaned meaning)

Hokkien borrowings

Some Hokkien words with the same meaning are used to replace standard Mandarin words.

Monosyllabic borrowings

Some Hokkien mono-syllabic words are used instead of two-syllable words in Mandarin.

Omission of Mandarin words' suffixes

The suffix of certain Mandarin words might be omitted in colloquial Singaporean Mandarin due to the use of Hokkien mono-syllabic words. For instance, the suffix " " is commonly omitted in colloquial Singaporean Mandarin.

Replacing Mandarin morpheme with Hokkien morpheme

A morpheme in Mandarin is removed from a two-syllable word, leaving a one-syllable word, which is used in Hokkien.

Same meaning, different word order

Some multi-syllable words in Standard Mandarin might be used with a different word order (reversed or changed) in Hokkien, and the latter's word order is adopted into Singaporean Mandarin.

Modifying the meaning of Mandarin using Hokkien words

Certain words in Standard Mandarin have a different meaning in Hokkien, and this difference is adopted by Singaporean Mandarin.

Some examples of these are listed below.

Influences on grammar

Singaporean Hokkien has influenced Singaporean Mandarin Grammar in 5 main areas.

Word order

The word order refers to the order or sequence of how words are arranged in combination. Because of influence from Singaporean Hokkien, the word order in certain phrases are replaced by that of Singaporean Hokkien, or are simultaneously used with that of Singaporean Mandarin.

"Verb/object + complement" structure

In Standard Mandarin, certain object in predicate structure are put after a complement. However, the "verb/object + complement" structure is used in Singaporean Mandarin.

Examples are shown in the table below:

Changes in overlapping word order

Overlapping word order in Singaporean Mandarin sometimes differ from that of Standard Mandarin.

Examples are shown in the table below:

Overlapping of words

Certain mono-syllabic adjectives and verbs or two-syllable adjectives and verbs in Singaporean Hokkien have entered into Singaporean Mandarin. These are used together with their counterparts in Standard Mandarin.

Examples are shown in the table below:

Omission

Certain components of a sentence that are used in Standard Mandarin are omitted in colloquial Singaporean Mandarin, due to Hokkien influence on the latter.

Omission of directional verbs

Certain directional verbs are omitted or dropped in Singaporean Mandarin.

Examples are shown in the table below:

Omission of the word "得"

The word "得" used in the sentence structure between a verb and a complement has been omitted in colloquial Singaporean Mandarin

Examples are shown in the table below:

Omission of certain numbers

Certain numbers, which are expressed in Standard Mandarin, are omitted in colloquial Singaporean Mandarin.

Examples are shown in the table below:

Word groupings and arrangements

Certain word groupings and arrangements in colloquial Singaporean Mandarin sentences are greatly influenced by Hokkien.

Use of the words "有" and "無"

In Mandarin, the words "有" and "無" generally do not act as complementary verbs. But due to influence from Hokkien, colloquial Singaporean Mandarin uses them as complementary verbs.

Examples are shown in the table below:

Use of the word "到" in lieu of "得"

In a "verb+complement" sentence structure, standard Mandarin uses the word 得 to link the verb and complement. Singapore Mandarin, due to influence from Hokkien, uses the word 到 instead.

Examples are shown in the table below:

Use of the word "去"

Certain Singapore Mandarin sentence structures use the word  as the resultative complement, where another character (such as ) might be used in Standard Mandarin.

Examples are shown in the table below:

Use of Hokkien classifiers

A classifier (measure words) which is used with a certain noun in Hokkien might also be used similarly in Singapore Mandarin with the same noun, whereas another classifier might be used for that same word in Standard Mandarin.

Examples are shown in the table below:

Sentences

Certain sentence structures used in Singapore Mandarin are influenced by Hokkien, and differ from their Standard Mandarin counterparts.

Some cases are listed in the following sub-sections.

Use of the word "有"

The word "" (yǒu) is usually added in front of a verb or verb predicate to indicate an existing action or completed status.

Use of the word "会"

The use of word "" (huì) [literally "can"] is used in colloquial Singaporean Hokkien, and such a use has entered Singapore Mandarin.

Pronunciation of the word "了"

The word "" is often pronounced as "liǎo" instead of "le".

Use of the Hokkien sentence-final particles "嘛", "啦" or "咧"

Colloquial Singaporean Mandarin often involves the addition of Hokkien sentence-final particles such as "" (ma), "" (la) or "" (lēh).

See also
 Singaporean Mandarin
 Standard Singaporean Mandarin
 Languages of Singapore
 Chinese in Singapore
 Speak Mandarin Campaign
 Singapore Chinese characters
 Singdarin
 Standard Mandarin
 Taiwanese Mandarin
 Malaysian Mandarin
 Singaporean Hokkien

References
新加坡闽南话与华语 (Singaporean Hokkien and Mandarin)

Further reading
周清海编著， 《新加坡华语词汇与语法》，新加坡玲子传媒私人有限公司出版， 2002年9月, ，  (Zhou, Qinghai (2002), Vocabulary and Grammar of Singaporean Mandarin, Lingzi Media)
周清海(著)，《变动中的语言》，新加坡玲子传媒私人有限公司出版, 2009年, 、 (Zhou, Qinghai (2009), The changing languages, Lingzi Media)
周長揖、周清海(著)，《新加坡閩南話詞典》 ，中國社會科學出版社， 2002年， (Zhou Changyi, Zhou Qinghai (2002), "Singaporean Hokkien Dictionary", China Social Science Pub.)
周長揖(著)，《新加坡閩南話概説》 ，廈門大學出版社， 2000年 (Zhou Changyi (2000), "An Overview over Singaporean Hokkien", Xiamen University Pub.)
周長揖(著)，《新加坡閩南話俗語歌謠選》 ，廈門大學出版社， 2003年，(Zhou Changyi (2003), "Collection of Singaporean Hokkien Folk Adage and Ballad", Xiamen University Pub.)

Languages of Singapore
Chinese languages in Singapore
Mandarin Chinese